In mathematics, Riemann's differential equation, named after Bernhard Riemann, is a generalization of the hypergeometric differential equation, allowing the regular singular points  to occur anywhere on the Riemann sphere, rather than merely at 0, 1, and . The equation is also known as the Papperitz equation. 

Let α, β and γ be the exponents of one solution at 0, 1 and  respectively; and let α&apos;, β&apos; and γ&apos; be those of the other. Then

By applying suitable changes of variable, it is possible to transform the hypergeometric equation: Applying Möbius transformations will adjust the positions of the regular singular points, while other transformations (see below) can change the exponents at the regular singular points, subject to the exponents adding up to 1.

Definition
The differential equation is given by

As before, the exponents are subject to the condition

Solutions and relationship with the hypergeometric function
The solutions are denoted by the Riemann P-symbol (also known as the Papperitz symbol)

The standard hypergeometric function may be expressed as

The P-functions obey a number of identities; one of them allows a general P-function to be expressed in terms of the hypergeometric function.  It is

In other words, one may write the solutions in terms of the hypergeometric function as

The full complement of Kummer's 24 solutions may be obtained in this way; see the article hypergeometric differential equation for a treatment of Kummer's solutions.

Fractional linear transformations
The P-function possesses a simple symmetry under the action of fractional linear transformations known as Möbius transformations (that are the conformal remappings of the Riemann sphere), or equivalently, under the action of the group .

and

then one has the simple relation

expressing the symmetry.

Exponents 
If the Moebius transformation above moves the singular points but does not change the exponents, 
the following transformation does not move the singular points but changes the exponents:

See also
Method of Frobenius
Monodromy

Notes

References
 Milton Abramowitz and Irene A. Stegun, eds., Handbook of Mathematical Functions with Formulas, Graphs, and Mathematical Tables (Dover: New York, 1972)
 Chapter 15 Hypergeometric Functions
Section 15.6 Riemann's Differential Equation

Hypergeometric functions
Ordinary differential equations
Bernhard Riemann